Andros is a French multinational food company, specialized in fruit and dairy products making. The company is based in Biars-sur-Cère, in the Lot department, near the touristic Dordogne region and the city of Brive-la-Gaillarde, Corrèze.

Andros owns more than 40 factories all over the world, including production plants in China, Vietnam, and Virginia.

The family-owned company is well known for its long term primary sponsorship of the ice rallycross championship Andros Trophy and French rugby union club CA Brive.

History

At the end of the Second World War, Jean Gervoson decided to start a jam business whose headquarters were located near Brive-la-Gaillarde, in Biars-sur-Cère in the Lot. In 1971, the Bonne Maman brand was created. In 1976, Andros bought the factory from the company Pierrot Gourmand, a bankrupt manufacturer of lollipops , and used the production sites for the manufacture of sweets.

In 2000, Jean Gervoson left the management of the group and his two sons succeeded him, Frédéric Gervoson, who took over Andros and Bonne Maman jams, and Xavier Gervoson who took over Bonne Maman cakes.

At the end of the 2010s, the group began to shift towards environmental consciousness. In 2018, Andros launched Andros Gourmand & Végétal, a brand of desserts in the fresh section, made from coconut milk and almond milk to act as a low-carbon alternative to classic cow's milk yoghurts. Similarly, at the end of 2020, Andros launched the first recyclable compote gourd.

The Gervoson-Chapoulart family, owners of the group, have a fortune estimated at €1.2 billion in 2017.

Activities and brands
Andros brands include Andros Chef (gastronomic fruit products for catering); Biscuiterie Saint-Michel, a French manufacturer of cakes and biscuits; Bonne Maman, a French manufacturer of jam, marmalade, compotes, desserts, cakes and biscuits; Buddy Fruits (ready-to-eat fruit snacks); Mamie Nova (yogurts), Pierrot Gourmand (candies) and Solo Italia (frozen desserts). The company represented 19.5% of fruit juices in the fresh section, 47% of jams and even 62.4% of refrigerated compotes in 2017.

Biscuits
Bonne Maman and Saint-Michel biscuits are produced by Morina Baie Biscuits, a company owned by Andros. The turnover of this company was estimated at 450 million euros in 2019.

Subcontracting and distributor brands
The Andros group also produces frozen yoghurts, marmalades, confectionery, and desserts for large-scale distribution companies such as Carrefour. Andros also produces the filling for Whaou pancakes, Lidl gourds and Picard Yule logs.

Subsidiaries and factories

Andros have many subsidiaries around the world : Andros Asia in China, Japan and Vietnam; Andros Barker's in Australia and New Zealand after Barker's was bought by Andros and joined the group in 2015; Andros Foods North America in the United States or Los Nietitos in Uruguay for example.

Andros Asia operates three factories (two in Vietnam and one in China which opened in 1999) and distributes its products in eleven countries in Southeast Asia and East Asia.

Andros Foods North America operates a factory in Virginia. In 2012, Andros purchased Bowman Andros Products in Mount Jackson, a leader in private label apple product production since 1939. Old Virginia and Buddy Fruits products are made domestically there.

In May 2022, near the Biars-sur-Cère main factory, Andros opened a new transformation industrial site in Brive-la-Gaillarde, strengthening even more its influence in its native area.

Sponsoring

Andros invested heavily in sport. The group sponsors the Andros Trophy, an ice rallycross motorsport championship contest held in France since 1990, the Image Club d'Épinal, an ice hockey team, and French rugby union club CA Brive. A locally rooted firm, Andros is one of the most loyal and oldest of the Corrèze club and appeared season after season on the club's jerseys as a main sponsor.  The firm appeared on the 1996–97 Heineken Cup winners' jersey when Brive defeated Leicester Tigers in final. Xavier Ric, one of the current Brive officials, worked for Andros. Some former Brive players, like Jean-Luc Joinel, Cédric Heymans or Alain Penaud, work for the company.

More recently, Andros became sponsor of the French National Rugby League, the French Olympic Committee (CNOSF), rugby union club Racing 92 and the upcoming 2023 Rugby World Cup.

The firm also operates as a provider and a supplier for all these clubs and institutions, by offering fruit products for the clubs' meals and children games.

Controversies
In March 2015, Novandie, a subsidiary of the Andros group, along with eight other companies, was sentenced in a “yoghurt cartel” case for agreeing on the prices of dairy products. They were initially subjected to a fine of 38.3 million euros, but in 2017, the Paris Court of Appeal reduced the fine to 35 million euros.

In 2019, the Andros group was again convicted by the Competition Authority in the "compote cartel" case for forming a cartel with other players in the compote market to co-ordinate price increases. Initially subject to a 14 million euro fine, it was reduced as the investigation noted that "this company had, over the first two years of the cartel, 'disrupted' the operation of the cartel by behaving as a 'maverick' (i.e. by continuing to conduct an aggressive commercial policy to gain market share)”.

References

External links
 

French brands
Dairy products companies of France
Food and drink companies established in 1959
Multinational companies headquartered in France
Multinational dairy companies
French companies established in 1959
Companies based in Occitania (administrative region)
Privately held companies of France